Söderns hjärtas ros is a studio album by Monia Sjöström. It was released in May 2003.

Track listing
Mannen med gitarr (Per Gessle)
En lång väg av längtan (Peter LeMarc)
Rakt ut i natten (Mauro Scocco)
Kärlekståg till Montréal (Jörgen Smedshammar, Mattias Blomdahl)
Den här sortens kärlek (Per "Plura" Jonsson)
Ett steg åt ena hållet (Nisse Hellberg)
Hej du (Mauro Scocco)
Kom genom regnet (Jörgen Smedshammar, Mattias Blomdahl)
Du behöver en kvinna (Mauro Scocco)
Vägskäl (Shep)
Han påminner om dej (Martin Hansen, Mikael Nord Andersson)
Gabriel (Mauro Scocco)
Söders hjärtas ros (Mats Ronander, Thomas Enochsson)

Contributing musicians
Mikael Nord Andersson - guitar, dobro, mandolin, pedal steel
Peter Forss – bass
Thomas Haglund - violin
Christer Jansson - drums
Jesper Nordenström - piano, organ, fender rhodes, moog

Charts

References 

2003 albums
Monia Sjöström albums
Swedish-language albums